Austelino Tavares Correia (born 8 August 1968) is a Cape Verdean politician who currently serves as president of the National Assembly of Cape Verde since 2021.

Political career 
Correia graduated with a Bachelor of Social Science, from the Jean Piaget University of Cape Verde. He went on to complete a Master of Business Management at the Jean Piaget University of Cape Verde.

Correia was elected Deputy of the National Assembly in 2001. He joined Movement for Democracy in 2006.

Correia, was elected president of the National Assembly of Cape Verde on 19 May 2021, with a majority vote of 72 deputies, succeeding Jorge Santos, after his party Movement for Democracy won the 2021 parliamentary elections.

References 

1968 births
Living people
Presidents of the National Assembly (Cape Verde)
Movement for Democracy (Cape Verde) politicians
21st-century Cape Verdean politicians
Jean Piaget University of Cape Verde alumni